Faye Z. Belgrave is a psychologist known for her research conducted for the benefit of the African American youth, specifically in the areas of substance abuse and HIV. She is currently a professor of Psychology and the founding director of the Center for Cultural Experiences in Prevention (CCEP) at Virginia Commonwealth University (VCU).

Belgrave received awards and acknowledgement for her research including the 2018 Psychology and AIDS Distinguished Leadership Award from the American Psychological Association. She is the 2014 recipient of the VCU Presidential Awards for Community Multicultural Enrichment (PACME Award), which recognizes Belgrave's significant contributions to enhance VCU's commitment to diversity. Belgrave also received the 2014 Riese-Melton Award from VCU for her outstanding contributions to cross-cultural relations. In 2010, Belgrave received the Minority Fellowship Program Achievement Award: James Jones Lifetime Achievement Award from the American Psychological Association for her experience in teaching and training. In 2008, Belgrave received the State Council of Higher Education in Virginia's Outstanding Faculty Award. In 2016–17, CCEP under Belgrave's tenure as the director, was honored with the Currents of Change Award for Exemplary Partnership in Research from the VCU Council for Community Engagement which recognizes the CCEP's exceptional university-community partnerships.

Belgrave is the author of Psychosocial Aspects of Chronic Illness and Disability Among African Americans (1998), Sisters of Nia: A Cultural Enrichment Program to Empower African American Girls (2008), African American Girls: Reframing Perceptions and Changing Experiences (2009), and Brothers of Ujima: A Cultural Enrichment Program to Empower Adolescent African American Males (2011). She is the co-author of African American Psychology: From Africa to America (2013), and African American Boys: Identity, Culture, and Development (2014).

Biography 
Belgrave received her Bachelor of Science from North Carolina Agricultural and Technical State University and her Ph.D. from the University of Maryland, College Park in 1982. Belgrave became a professor at Virginia Commonwealth University in 1997. Some of the courses that she taught include graduate level Social Psychology, Program Evaluation, and undergraduate level African American Psychology.

Belgrave worked with many collaborators for her research (e.g., community partners or funding agencies) including local school systems, churches and faith based institutions, community based youth servicing agencies, local health clinics, and Black Colleges and Universities among others. Some of the funding agencies that supported Belgrave's research include the Substance Abuse and Mental Health Services Administration, National Cancer Institute, Health and Human Services Office on Women's Health to Virginia Commonwealth University, and Virginia Tobacco Settlement Foundation.

Research 
Belgrave's research focuses in the areas of drug and HIV prevention among African Americans and other ethnic minorities, specifically the youth and young adults. She conducts research at the Virginia Commonwealth University Center for Cultural Experiences in Prevention. She is currently the primary investigator for the project: "Building Capacity for Substance Abuse and HIV Prevention among African American Young Adults" which began in 2015 and is expected to be completed in 2020. In this project, she is working with community partners Fan Free Clinic, Nia Incorporated of Greater Richmond, and the VCU Wellness Resource Center, and is funded by the Substance Abuse and Mental Health Administration.

Belgrave helps to raise awareness about the topic of HIV, specifically among African American youth. She has been involved in multiple projects related to improving awareness and prevention including the "HIV and Substance Abuse Prevention Among African American College Students / RAISE 5", and "Enhanced Sisters Informing Sisters about Topics on AIDS (SISTA) HIV Prevention Curriculum: The Role of Drug Education."

Belgrave is the principal investigator and project director for the "Raise 5 Project." This project's purpose is to bring awareness to substance abuse and dangers having to do with sexual behavior. In particular, Belgrave and her party strive to reduce HIV and substance abuse in the African American community. Raise 5 uses five major strategies to achieve this goal and is funded for five years by the Substance Abuse and Mental Health Services Administration, and the Office on Women's Health. It is a collaborative effort with community partners Fan Free Clinic and the VCU Wellness Resource Center.

The project, SISTA, focused on teaching heterosexual African American women the importance of having protected sex, and how decision making can be effected after consuming substances. There was an evaluation done of this curriculum to study the effectiveness of the enhanced curriculum compared to the standard SISTA curriculum that Belgrave had been using. The enhanced SISTA intervention demonstrated greater effectiveness than did the standard SISTA intervention in promoting HIV knowledge at post-test and subsequent condom use at the 3-month follow-up.

Representative publications 

 Abrams, J. A., Maxwell, M., Pope, M., & Belgrave, F. Z. (2014). Carrying the world with the grace of a lady and the grit of a warrior: Deepening our understanding of the “Strong Black Woman” schema. Psychology of Women Quarterly, 38(4), 503–518.  
 Belgrave, F. Z., & Allison, K. W. (2013). African American psychology: From Africa to America. 3rd Edition. Thousand Oaks: Sage.  
 Belgrave, F. Z., Chase-Vaughn, G., Gray, F., Addison, J. D., & Cherry, V. R. (2000). The Effectiveness of a culture and gender-specific intervention for increasing resiliency among African American preadolescent females. Journal of Black Psychology, 26(2), 133–147.  
 Bowleg, L., Belgrave, F. Z., & Reisen, C. A. (2000). Gender roles, power strategies, and precautionary sexual self-efficacy: Implications for Black and Latina women's HIV/AIDS protective behaviors. Sex roles, 42(7-8), 613–635.  
 Maxwell, M., Brevard, J., Abrams, J., & Belgrave, F. (2015). What's color got to do with it? Skin color, skin color satisfaction, racial identity, and internalized racism among African American college students. Journal of Black Psychology, 41(5), 438–461.

References

External links 
Faculty Page
Research Lab Profile

Living people
American women psychologists
21st-century American psychologists
North Carolina A&T State University alumni
University of Maryland, College Park alumni
Virginia Commonwealth University faculty
Year of birth missing (living people)
Place of birth missing (living people)
American women academics
21st-century American women